Alaskan Brewing Company is a brewery in Juneau, Alaska founded in 1986. The company's beers have won awards at regional, national, and international beer competitions.

The brewery was founded by Marcy and Geoff Larson, they are still in charge of the company. By sales volume, it is the 19th largest craft brewery in the United States, .

Beers 
The Alaskan Brewing Company brews eight year-round beers, four seasonal beers, and several limited edition beers.  The year-round beers are: Alaskan Amber, Freeride APA, Icy Bay IPA, Alaskan White, Hopothermia, Smash Galaxy, and Husky IPA.  The seasonal beers are: Spruce IPA (January - April), Kölsch (May - August), Cranberry Tart (September - December) and Winter Ale.

See also
 Beer in the United States

References 

Beer brewing companies based in Alaska
Companies established in 1986
Companies based in Juneau, Alaska
1986 establishments in Alaska